Myszęcin  is a village in the administrative district of Gmina Szczaniec, within Świebodzin County, Lubusz Voivodeship, in western Poland.

The village has a population of 632.

References

Villages in Świebodzin County